Jubilee Street is a historical main street in Central, Hong Kong Island, Hong Kong. Jubilee Street was named for the 50th anniversary of Queen Victoria's reign in 1887.

History
The street used to run along the waterfront and the street was also known for the Jubilee Street Pier. The pier was demolished in 1994 following further land reclamation.

Features
The street links Queen's Road Central, Des Voeux Road Central and Connaught Road Central. Central Market and the headquarters of Hang Seng Bank are located there. One of the entrance of The Center leads to the street.

References

Central, Hong Kong
Roads on Hong Kong Island